A tandem rolling mill is a rolling mill with two or more close-coupled stands, where the reduction is achieved by the inter-stand tension(s) and the compressive force between the work rolls.

For mills rolling thinner strip, bridles may be added either at the entry and/or the exit to increase the strip tension near the adjacent stands further increasing their reduction capability.

Introduction

The first mention of a tandem rolling mill is Richard Ford's 1766 English patent for the hot rolling of wire. 
In 1798 he received another patent, this time for the hot rolling of plates and sheets using a tandem mill.

The main advantages of a tandem mill are:
 Only one single pass is required which saves time and increases production;
 Also greater tensions are possible between the stands, and this increases the reduction possible in the stands for the same roll force.

One disadvantage of a tandem mill is the high capital cost compared to that of a single stand reversing mill.

The need for tandem rolling mills, and rolling mills in general, is being reduced by the use of continuous casters.

The development of transfer bar casting, also called thin slab casting  meant that slab roughing mills were no-longer required.

Thin strip casting  with a thickness of 2 mm has bypassed the tandem hot mill; and further reduction in the casting thickness to produce strip steel the same as annealed cold rolled strip will bypass the tandem cold mill and the annealing process.

Each stand of a tandem mill is set up for rolling using the mill-stand's spring curve and the compressive curve of the metal so that both the rolling force and the exit thickness of each stand are determined.

This article describes the characteristics of a mill stand, the properties of a metal (especially steel), and the control of a tandem mill using both equations and diagrams.

Mill stand characteristics

The mill stand spring curve is obtained by pressing the work rolls together with increasing force. This causes the work rolls to bend, the screw-downs to compress and the mill housings to stretch.
To reduce work roll bending, a much larger roll is positioned above the top work roll and another is placed below the bottom work roll. This arrangement is called a 4-high mill, as shown in sketch 1.

The red line in graph 1 is the linear approximation 

or conversely, the screw-down position

where  is called the mill modulus and is the slope of the spring curve in the area of the datum point . For most mills  is approximately 4 MN/mm. Larger values would require much thicker mill housings and screw-downs.

A datum is performed by lowering the screws below face until the measured force equals the required datum force , at which point the screw-down position is set so that it equals the datum screw position . At BlueScope Steel's No. 2 temper mill the datum point was 5 mm at a force of 7 MN.

Wood and Ivacheff
analysed the information obtained when measuring the mill modulus by pressing the work rolls together until a typical rolling force was reached, and then they continued to measure the force and screw-down position as the rolls were lifted. The shape of the plotted figures (overlaid, looped, or a figure eight) was found to give good indication of the mill stand's condition.

The datum point is chosen so that the screw-down position  is never negative. This was necessary with the control computers of the 1960s, such as the GE/PAC 4020 installed at the then Australian Iron & Steel (now BlueScope) Port Kembla plate mill, which used an assembler language that did not like negative numbers.

Also, a datum point is used rather than trying to measure the point at which the force just becomes zero.

The exact equation used to calculate the required screw-down setting for a required force is:

It is set to zero after a work roll change, when the datum is performed with the new rolls at room temperature.

Roll force measurement

Load cells are used to measure the force exerted onto the work rolls by the product.

To obtain the true roll force acting on the work rolls the position of the load cells is important; are they with the filler plates under the bottom backup-roll bearings, or on top of the top backup-roll bearings. Both positions are shown in sketch 2.

Another thing that must be considered (if they are present) is the roll balance cylinders.

The roll balance cylinders act to separate the work rolls (no force between them) when the screw-downs are raised; that is, the force of the balance cylinders  is just greater than the weight of the top roll set, .

Since the roll weights are only nominal values, any residual error is slowly zeroed out whenever the roll balance is on and the screws are raised sufficiently.

Steel characteristics

A useful formula for the compression curve of steel is:

where
 is the metal's hardness;
 is the metal's initial thickness;
 is the metal's exit thickness;
 moves the curve vertically, i.e. it sets the initial yield stress;
 changes the slope, i.e. the metal's work hardening rate.

The initial steep section in graph 2 is elastic compression. The effective height of this is reduced by the entry and exit tensions when present, as in a tandem mill. Notice that the curve becomes steeper as the thickness approaches zero, i.e. it would take infinite force to make the steel infinitely thin.

The slope of the plastic region around the operating point is normally represented by the letter .

Mathematical modelling

For a rolling mill to operate, the work roll gap is set prior to the product entering the mill. Originally this setting was empirical; that is, set by the operators according to their experiences of that product's initial dimensions and the required finished thickness.

With a reversing mill, the profile of intermediate thicknesses was also empirical. To obtain greater consistency, attempts were made to characterize the rolling process. In 1948, Bland and Ford
 were one of the first to publish such a mathematical model.

Essentially such mathematical models represent the mill (its spring curve) and the compressive behavior of the product to calculate the mill's "setup".

Mill setup calculation
The term "setup" is used for the calculation of the actuator settings required by each mill stand to roll the product. These settings include the initial screw-down position, the main drive speed, and the entry and exit tension references where applicable.

This setup calculation is normally performed either in a lower-level computer or a PLC that controls a rolling mill stand(s).

A graphical representation of a mill model can be obtained by plotting the mill stand spring curve and the compression curve for the strip against the same distance axes; then the intersection point gives the solution of expected rolling force , and final Strip Thickness , and also the required initial screw-down position . See graph 3.

In its simplest form

This equation is known as the BISRA equation.

If the work rolls are initially pressed together by the screw-downs, then there will be a force  acting between the top and bottom work rolls before the strip is present. In this situation, the Mill is said to be set "below face", as shown in graph 3. This is often the case with thin strip.

However, if there is an actual gap before the metal enters the mill, then  will be zero, and (from equation 1)  must be greater than 

The calculation is repeated for the following stands with the exit thickness  of the one stand becoming the entry thickness  of the next stand. Note that the compression curve has a greater or lesser elastic region depending on the entry and exit tension stresses of that next stand.

Interstand tensions

One could say the steel is compressed by the force of the work rolls, equivalent to forging; however, if there are tensions present, then it could be said that the steel is stretched by the tension pulling it through the rotating work rolls, as in extruding through a die. See sketch 3.

The tensions reduce the effective elasticity of the product by an amount equal to the induced tension strain. This tension effect is represented in graphs 2 and 3 by drawing the steel compression curve with the elastic region reduced accordingly.

The relationship of the rolling force to the entry and exit strip tensions is important in determining the finished strip flatness. Too much force produces strip with edge wave (often called "pressure wave"). Too much tension, that is too little force, can cause center buckle (depending on the crown of the rolls).

The tension stress is 30% to 50% of the yield stress for cold mills and often higher in hot mills (which can result in heavy necking and even strip breaks).

In sketch 4, observe that the force is offset from the work roll centers because the strip is thicker at the entry than at the exit; this is one component of the torque that the main drives must supply. The other component is the difference in the tension forces. If the exit tension force is much greater than the entry tension force, then the tension torque may be larger than the torque due to the rolling-force and the main drives will generate power.

The neutral point, or no-slip point is the point within the roll bite where the work rolls and the strip are doing the same speed.

The position of the neutral point is influenced by the entry and exit tensions.

Shudder occurs when the neutral point is at an edge of the roll bite; that is the work rolls are alternately grabbing the strip and letting it slip.

Forward slip  is the ratio of the exit strip speed to the work rolls peripheral speed.  Backward slip  is the ratio of the entry strip speed to the work rolls peripheral speed.

Roll wear
As the strip slides through the work rolls it polishes them and the strip. This changes the friction coefficient of the strip-to-roll surface. So, to predict the forces and the power required to drive the work rolls, the mill modelling estimates this roll wear based on the length of strip rolled.

To reduce the friction in the roll bite, a warm oil-water emulsion is sprayed at the entry side of the roll bite in cold rolling mills.

The work rolls of all the stands in a tandem mill are normally changed at the same time. The new work rolls will have been ground to restore their desired crown and roughness. When this is done, the roll wear is reset to zero in the modelling.

The heat generated in the roll bite of a cold mill warms both the strip and the rolls. Since the cold mill rolls have no coolant applied, just a small amount of warm oil-water emulsion, the work rolls in a cold mill become hotter than those in a hot mill, where copious amounts of cold water are sprayed at the exit side of the roll bite.

Back-up roll bearings speed effect

The back-up roll bearings are usually white-metal bearings which rely on a film of oil between the shaft and the white-metal to reduce the friction; as seen in sketch 5.

As the speed increases more oil is dragged into the active region of the bearing and this increases the thickness of the oil film in this region. This pushes the top work roll down and the bottom work roll up, which reduces the roll gap in the same manner as running the screws down. To compensate for this, most screw-down control loops include a feed-forward parameter derived from either; an equation of rolling speed, or a value extracted from a lookup table using linear interpolation.

To ensure an oil film exists even at zero speed; pumps are often used to force oil through very tiny holes into the bearing's active region; this is referred to as hydrostatics.

In Chart 1, the scale for the screw-downs position (mauve trace) was 0.2mm per division; this was too coarse. Consequently Chart 2 was created from a similar coil, but with a screw-down position scale of 0.06mm per division; that is, from 5.8mm to 6.4mm.

In the chart recordings, notice that the force (light green trace) has been held constant by the automatic control, which has raised the screw-downs (mauve trace) as the speed (red trace) has increased.  This increase in screw position is a measure of the white metal bearing speed effect.

For a more accurate measurement, the force of each mill stand is measured as it is run through its speed range without strip present.

The values measured from Chart 2 were plotted in an Excel spreadsheet.

Note that the use of oil hydrostatics can hold the oil film nearly constant up to about 20% of full speed; hence no screw-down movement would be required in that low speed range (this is shown as the red line in the graph of the measured points).

Now recall the gaugemeter equation in its simplest form:

This equation is modified to include the backup roll bearing speed effect  especially when rolling product which has a thickness similar to the speed effect (~400 μm at some temper mills). Thus,

Discontinuity in the stress verses strain of annealed steel

The discontinuity in the stress/strain of annealed steel makes it impossible to create round tinned steel-cans. Wherever the steel bends first is where most of the bending will occur, rather than uniformly.

The discontinuity is shown within the red circle in graph 4. It is the reason the strip is given a light reduction (~1.3%) normally referred to as an elongation or extension.

Since it is referred to as an elongation and not a reduction, this strip is said to have been reduced only once (at the cold mill prior to annealing); hence the term single reduced (SR).

After the elongation, the discontinuity is no longer present.

Alternatively; after annealing, the steel strip can be reduced a second time (by up to 30%) to make it both thinner and work hardened. When this is done, the strip is said to have been reduced twice; that is, doubled reduced (DR).

Grade adaption
While a tandem mill is rolling, the "setup" computer collects the following information:

 motor currents, voltages and speeds
 strip tensions
 rolling forces
 roll gaps (screw-down positions)
 X-ray gauge(s) readings.

It also has available the coil's schedule information:

 entry thickness and width
 required exit thickness
 grade of steel

The actual rolling forces are compared with the forces predicted by the mill model given the information obtained. Any differences adjust the calculated forces by trimming the force adaptors,  . Thus equation 5 becomes

Recall that equation 3 gave the compressive strength of steel at  BlueScope steel's 5 stand cold mill

Also the slope of the force adaptors corrected the work hardening rate,  for the same grade of steel.
This made switching between grades from coil-to-coil much smoother.

Threading

A few difficulties arise when threading any tandem cold mill.

One way to minimize these problems is to use "open-gap" threading.

With open-gap threading, the next stand to be threaded has a roll gap greater than the thickness of the strip. Once threaded, the top work roll is lowered onto the strip and then the strip moves on. Open-gap threading ensures that the head-end does not mark the work rolls as it enters the roll-gap. And having the strip stopped as the screw-downs are lowered avoids skidding as the work roll just touch the strip. 

For "closed-gap" threading of a tandem mill, it is important that the head-end of the strip remains flat so that it enters the next stand easily. Immediately the strip enters a stand, there is no tension on either side of it; this means that the force would be greater than during rolling, so the roll gap (screw-downs) initially needs to be increased a little with respect to that required during rolling in order to prevent excessive edge-wave.

The closed-gap screw-down setting is calculated using the mill model for thread speed and with no tensions.

Another issue with closed-gap threading is the speed of the stand being threaded.
It needs to be faster than the proceeding stand, so that the strip doesn't build up between the stands; but not so fast that it pulls the strip taught too quickly and breaks the strip.

In all cases, the strip's head-end will remain thicker because of the lack of tensions as it is threaded; consequently there will be a sizeable amount of head-end off-gauge strip that must be scrapped later.

Notice in the gif simulation, that the head-end speed remained constant when moving.
This was the practice at BlueScope Steel's 5 stand cold mill.

Control issues

The control of a tandem rolling mill is multi-layered.

Two examples are shown for  BlueScope Steel's No.2 temper mill with the exit stand configured for strip shape (flatness).

At the lowest level is the current/voltage control of the DC electrical drive motors.

At this level the bridles and reels are in open-loop tension mode; this means they run with a voltage which is related to the strip speed and a current controlled according to the tension required in the nearby strip. The tension reel has a motoring current to pull the strip taught, and the payoff reel generates to pull back against the strip. To keep these tensions constant during acceleration/deceleration of the mill, an additional current must be applied to the reels and bridles to produce the extra torque required to accelerate/decelerate them, especially when there is a large part of a coil on a reel. This is referred to as “inertia compensation”.

Above the direct motor controls, is the last stand's force control which sets the strip flatness. The rolls heat up slowly while processing a coil, and this would close the roll gap and increase the rolling force; however, to prevent this increase, the force control raises the screw-downs occasionally, as required.

Also at this level is the inter-stand tension control. It can act into either of the adjacent stands, but as in the diagrams shown, it acted into both stands in the proportions shown.

The thickness/elongation controls and speed profile sit above all of the other control loops.
The speed profile is determined in the mathematic modelling according to the desired reduction. It is multiplied by the master ramp's speed as set by the operator using his/her inputs, which are: thread (go to thread speed); run (accelerate to top speed); hold (stop acceleration/deceleration); stop (steady deceleration to zero speed); and emergency stop (uses maximum deceleration possible).

Back-up roll eccentricity

With hot rolled slabs and plates, the thickness varies mainly due to the changes in the temperature along the length. The colder sections are a result of the supports in the re-heat furnace.

When cold rolling, virtually all of the strip thickness variation is the result of the eccentricity and out-of-roundness of the back-up rolls from about stand three of the hot strip mill through to the finished product. 

The back-up roll eccentricity can be up to 100 μm in magnitude per stack. The eccentricity can be measured off-line by plotting the force variation against time with the mill on creep, no strip present, and the mill stand below face.

A modified fourier analysis was employed by the five stand cold mill at Bluescope Steel, Port Kembla from 1986 until that cold mill ceased production in 2009. Within each coil, the exit thickness deviation times 10 for every meter of strip was stored in a file. This file was analyzed separately for each frequency/wavelength from 5m to 60m in steps of 0.1m. To improve the accuracy, care was taken to use a full multiple of each wavelength (100*). The calculate amplitudes were plotted against the wavelength, so that the spikes could be compared to the expected wavelengths created by the backup rolls of each stand.

If a mill stand is fitted with hydraulic pistons in series with, or instead of the electrically driven mechanical screws, then it is possible to eliminate the effect of that stands back-up roll eccentricity. While rolling, the eccentricity of each back-up roll is determined by sampling the roll force and assigning it to the corresponding portion of each back-up roll's rotational position. These recordings are then used to operate the hydraulic piston so as to neutralize the eccentricities.

Sensitivities and their uses

In a tandem rolling mill, the gearing of the screw-downs is normally large enough that the work rolls can be moved during rolling. With such a ratio the worm gear is said to be  self-locking; that is, the rolling force is unable to push through the worm drive and rotate the electrical drive motor. This means that no brake is attached to the electrical motor.

If during rolling, it is necessary to move the screw-downs to correct either the rolling force or the exit strip thickness, then consider the triangle, shown circled in the graph 5 and enlarged in sketch 6, created when the screw-downs are moved down from the purple line to the green line.

The strip becomes thinner and the rolling force increases.

Therefore, 

Which gives

This term is used to ensure that the control of the rolling force using the screws is independent of the metal being rolled.

Using  gives

This factor is used to guarantee that the control of the exit thickness by the screws is independent of the metal being rolled.

The process sensitivities are highly product dependent, so to obtain reasonable values they are calculated off-line in the setup computer, and then incorporated in the real-time control systems.

Mass flow

A rolling mill does not create nor destroy steel during normal steady state rolling. That is, the same mass of steel leaves the mill as entered it.

But the entry length  and the exit length  where  is the total rolling time.
Therefore  

The density  is unaffected by the rolling process and can be cancelled out.
The width may change, but it does so by an insignificant amount (only a fraction of the strip thickness), and so the change may be ignored when rolling thin (<1mm) strip. The roll force tends to widen the strip, while the entry and exit tensions (when present) tend to make the strip narrower.

So, cancelling the density , the width , and the time , gives

This can be used in a rolling mill to calculate the exit thickness  that the X-ray gauge will measure when the corresponding portion of the strip finally reaches the gauge.

By assuming all of the cold mill head-end off-gauge has been completely removed by the previous continuous annealing line; the scheduled entry thickness can be substituted in place of the actual entry thickness, .
Then the entry bridle and exit bridle speeds can be used as the measurements of entry speed,  and exit speed,  respectively.

The resulting calculated thickness deviation can be seen as the light blue trace in chart recording 3. Notice that the thickness control was working at thread speed (red trace). In the block diagram, the calculated gauge (thickness) is q62 and the thickness error is q66. Note the use of the sensitivity factor dS/dh as q2. There are two other interesting factors with this control:

A bumpless PI control

Initially the control appears to be a PD control with q18 containing a P term equal to q16 times the gain q4, plus a D term being the constant q10 times the change in q16. However, since q20 is effectively added to itself, this summation converts the P term into an integral, and the D term becomes a proportional term. This arrangement has the advantage that the gains q4 and q10 can be changed while the control loop is active without causing a step in the output q20; that is, it's a bumpless control. The overall maximum/minimum limit is designed to prevent the equivalent of integral windup.

An NIC trim into the inter-stand tension control

Normally moving the screw-downs to correct the strip thickness would perturb the inter-stand tension; its control would then need to trim the speed of the appropriate stand to restore the tension. So, what is required, is a compensating trim applied to the tension control at the same time as the thickness trim goes to the screw-downs. This is referred to as a non-interactive control;
that is, the thickness correction no-longer disturbs the tension. In the block diagram, the screw trim q20 is converted into a compensating IS tension trim using the sensitivity factor dT/dS (the value of this was measured by applying a small step change to the thickness reference and looking for any change in the IS tension).

For the coil in chart recording 1 above, the cold mill Head-end off-gauge was not fully removed at the CA line; this can be seen as the difference between the X-ray deviation (green trace) and the calculated thickness deviation (light blue trace).

Bridle rolls

Bridle rolls are used to increase or decrease the strip tension in a processing line or rolling mill.

The bridle rolls normally come in a set of two, three, or four rolls of equal diameter, with each roll individually powered by an electric motor/generator.  The drives of the entry bridle generate power as they pull back and increase the strip tension after them. This power is partly provided by the exit bridle which pulls on the strip before it, and so decreases the strip tension after it.

To assist with threading there are normally guides and even a pinch roll or rolls, as shown for the two roll bridle in sketch 7.

To determine the size of the electrical drives, it is necessary to calculate the values of the intermediate tension or tensions.

 where
 is the strip speed in m/sec
 is the strip thickness in meters
 is the radius of the Bridle Rolls in meters and
 is the Bridle's angular speed in radians per second.

The electrical power required by the drive motor = volts ⋅ amps. The voltage can be regulated according to the strip speed, leaving the current to be proportional to the required tension change.

To prevent slippage, the bridle rolls within a set are operated at only a fraction  of the maximum tension difference, so the actual tension difference across each bridle roll will be . That is, a lower value of friction is used in the calculations.

Consider the simplest case:

A two roll bridle set with both rolls having the same wrap angle .

Therefore  which gives, 

And so

Now consider an example:

And so, the second bridle requires just over 40% more motor power compared to the first.

If one wishes to reduce the number of spares; then it is desirable to have motors of the same power.

To do that, the wrap angle on the first bridle must be increased so that the tension difference across both bridles is the same;

. That is,

Let the wrap angle of bridle roll 1 be , where  is the wrap angle of bridle roll 2.

That is 

Taking logarithms of both sides gives

For bridle roll 2: 

Again, taking logarithms gives

From equations B4 and B5:

Now consider a four roll bridle with tensions . Normally in such a bridle set, all of the rolls have the same strip wrap angle, as shown in sketch 7.

Therefore, using equation B2

Similarly, 

So if we let  then  which gives 

And finally

Inter-stand tension control

Consider a violin string:

Now consider the strip between the stands of a multi-stand mill:

The overall transfer function from speed-difference to tension is:

Therefore, the control loop divides the tension error by the strip width  and the strip thickness  in order to have a consistent response.

In chart recording 4, the two components necessary to change the tension (brown trace) can be seen in the speed trim (light blue trace). There is the extra speed difference necessary to stretch the strip already in the inter-stand gap (large trim); and the slight increase in speed difference to maintain the new level of tension.

Strip shape

Strip shape is one of the important quality factors of a finished strip, along with the thickness and the mechanical properties.

Poor shape is revealed when the strip fails to lie flat when placed unrestrained on a flat surface. To perform this test, a sample of strip is taken at least 3 wraps in from the end of the finished coil; this is called a "run-out".

Shape errors occur when the strip has not been rolled uniformly across its width.
The problem is, that strip shape cannot be seen while the strip is being rolled because it is under tension; hence the need to do a run-out. 

The main shape defects are:
 Edge wave; either on one side or both.
 Center buckle. This tends to be the opposite of edge wave.
 Quarter buckle. This occurs mid-way between the center and either edge.
 Herringbone buckle. This is attributed to regions of transverse stress, which shows up as diagonal buckling.

An error in shape is quoted in I-units. If part of 100m of strip is rolled 1mm longer than the rest, then it is in error by one I-unit.

There are a few ways in which the shape can be influenced:

Coil collapse

If a coil of thin strip is wound with low tension,
then it may not have the strength to support itself and may collapse, especially if roughly handled, see figure 1(a).
A solution is to provide chocks to support the coils more appropriately.

If a large coil is wound with a high tension,
then the tension stress builds up on the inner wraps and can cause them to kink, as seen in figure 1(b).
An early solution was to place a steel sleeve onto the tension reel mandrel before the coil started.
However, loading the sleeve slowed production, and the handling of the sleeves back from the following production lines added an extra cost.

Figure 1(c) shows a coil with a sleeve sitting on chocks.

Industrial Automation Services devised a solution.
The early wraps are wound with a high tension to create a pseudo sleeve,
then the body of the coil is wound with a moderate tension supported by that pseudo sleeve; as shown in figure 1(d).

Computers and HMI

In the 1980's it became possible for digital displays to replace hard-wired headboard-mimics and operator control/display panels.

The descriptions below are based on the upgrade of BlueScope Steel's 5 stand cold mill in 1985.

There are normally three levels of computers directly associated with a tandem rolling mill, as shown in sketch 11.

Level 1 real-time control
At the lowest level is a Programable Logic Controller, PLC or minicomputer.

The PLC or minicomputer contains the control loops that run the rolling mill. It receives inputs into these dynamic controls directly from the hard-wired desk
and gets the targets for the exit thickness, the tensions and the screw-down positions from the setup computer.

The desk controls include the speed requests (the thread, run and stop push buttons), any screw-down movements
(each joystick has raise, lower, tilt left, and tilt right), and the tension trims (increase / decrease toggle switches).

Level 2 batch processing
At level 2 is a keyboard and screen having a menu-based interface into the setup computer's mill model.
This operator interface is normally described as the Human Machine Interface, HMI. Through this interface
the operator trims the setup for the next coil. He/she can trim the individual stand reductions, the inter-stand tensions, and the top speed as required.
When the last stand has force control, then the rolling force can also be trimmed.

At this level there are a few TV monitors. At BlueScope Steel's cold mill these monitors included:
 A mimic of the process with digital displays of: the statuses (ON / OFF, running / stopped); the screw-down positions in mm in the top back-up rolls; the stand speeds in mpm in the bottom back-up rolls; the tension readings in kN adjacent to the tension rolls, and the diameter of the coil on tension reel.
 A display with collections of bar graphs grouped according to type: that is, the tensions, the rolling forces, and the currents in percent. This display also has a graph of the thickness error in percent.

Actually these displays can be connected to either level 1 or level 2; for example, after the more recent (in 1997) BlueScope Steel upgrade of their 6 stand hot strip mill,
the operator displays are driven by the level 1 PLC's.

Level 3 supervision
The setup computer gets each coil's primary data from a scheduling computer.
This scheduling computer usually receives the product's data from the previous production unit
and will pass on the results of this mill's rolling to the next unit.

The primary data sent by the scheduling computer consists of the nominal entry thickness and width, the aim thickness, and if rolling a plate the aim width.

The scheduler assembles the coils or plates to be processed within each campaign using his/her Human Computer Interface, HCI terminal.

A campaign begins with a scheduled roll change; that is, when all of the work rolls of the tandem mill are changed together.

For a cold tandem mill, the campaign has a coffin-shaped width profile. The first few coils are about 3/4 of the full width.
Gradually the coils become wider until the maximum product width is reached. This allows the thermal camber of the rolls to develop before rolling the full-width product.
From then on the product becomes narrower, to avoid the excessive work roll wear corresponding to the strip edges.

Rolling mill definitions

These definition only apply to the rolling of slabs, plates and strip in a rolling mill.

Reduction

Reduction,  is defined as the per-unit change in thickness with respect to the entry thickness , and so  where  is the exit thickness.

As the material is reduced, its length becomes proportionately longer; this can be seen in the attached GIF movie.

There are many other definitions of the word reduction; such as in chemistry, medicine, surgery, safety, investment, and in a more general sense, such as in cooking and waste reduction, etc.

Elongation

When the reduction is small (<2%), it is normally referred to as an elongation or an extension.

Elongation,  is defined as the per-unit increase in length due to a decrease in area with respect to the entry, regardless of shape.

Given an entry length , then  where  is the final length.

If the width is unaffected (as is the case when rolling thin strip <2mm, see sketch 12), then the mass flow concept, gives  
Thus elongation, 

When the elongation is large it is normally measured as reduction,  which is defined as the per-unit change in thickness with respect to the entry thickness ; and so if  is the exit thickness,
Reduction,  

Note that the thickness difference  is divided by the exit thickness  for elongation and by the entry thickness  with reduction; so they are not identical.

An elongation of typically 1.3% is performed to eliminate the discontinuity (seen at the yield point in graph 6) in the stress verses strain reaction of thin steel strip before it is tinned ready for making cans intended for containing preserved foods.

There are many other definitions of the word elongation; such as in astronomy, plasma physics, genetics, and in a more general sense, such as referring to the lengthening of an elastic band.

See also
 Deformation (engineering)
 Plasticity (physics)
 Steelmaking
 Steel mill
 Rolling (metalworking)
 Rolling Mill
 Work hardening
 Yield (engineering)
 Drawer slides roll forming machine

References

Further reading

 Sims, R.B., "The calculation of roll force and torque in hot rolling mills", Proceedings of the Institution of Mechanical Engineers, vol 168, no. 1, June 1954, pp 191200.
 Lianis, G.; and Ford, H., "Control equations of multi-stand cold rolling mills", Proceedings of I.M.E., vol. 171, June 1957, pp 757776.
 Bryant, G.F. (Editor); "Automation of Tandem Mills", The Iron & Steel Institute, London, 1973.
 Aeberli, K., "Combining the extended mass flow concept with eccentricity control for excellent gauge performance", Metals, Mining & More, Siemens, vol. 1, January 1997.
 Pittner, John; Simaan, Marwan A., "Tandem Cold Metal Rolling Mill Control using Practical Advanced Methods", Springer, London, 2010.

Rolling mills
Metal forming